The 2020 Supercopa de España Final decided the winner of the 2019–20 Supercopa de España, the 36th edition of the annual Spanish football super cup competition. The match was played on 12 January 2020 at King Abdullah Sports City in Jeddah, Saudi Arabia. The final featured city rivals Real Madrid and Atlético Madrid.

Real Madrid won the match 4–1 on penalties, following a 0–0 draw after extra time, to win their 11th Supercopa title.

Teams

Route to the final

Match

Details

References

2020 Final
2019–20 in Spanish football cups
Real Madrid CF matches
Atlético Madrid matches
January 2020 sports events in Asia
Sport in Jeddah
International club association football competitions hosted by Saudi Arabia
Association football penalty shoot-outs
Madrid Derby matches